Almost: Round Three is a skateboarding video that was released in DVD format in 2004. The video is the inaugural full-length production of the Almost Skateboards company, which was cofounded by professional skateboarders Rodney Mullen and Daewon Song in the previous year.

Overview
The video was produced as the third part of the Rodney Mullen vs. Daewon Song series, the first two of which are included on this DVD as hidden extras. Round Three also features individual parts by the Almost team of the time: Chris Haslam, Cooper Wilt, Ryan Sheckler, William Patrick (played by Tyrone Olson and Chris Casey), and Greg Lutzka. The video has also featured in various selections of 'best skate videos' over time.

Soundtrack
Opening - Journey - Any Way You Want It
Chris Haslam - The Cardigans - My Favorite Game 
Cooper Wilt - Franz Ferdinand - Come On Home
Ryan Sheckler - The Cure - Why Can't I Be You?
William Patrick - The Mr. Move - Ghetto Whomper
Greg Lutzka - The Jimi Hendrix Experience - All Along the Watchtower
Rodney Mullen - The Clash - Train in Vain and Massive Attack - Teardrop
Daewon Song - The Killers - All These Things That I've Done

See also
Dwindle Distribution

References

External links
Almost Skateboards official website
 

Skateboarding videos
American sports documentary films
2000s American films